Possumtown is an unincorporated community located within Piscataway Township in Middlesex County, New Jersey, United States. The area is mostly a residential neighborhood nestled between Possumtown Road, River Road (CR 622) and Interstate 287. The neighborhood has two parks within its environs: Wynnewood Park and Possumtown Park.

References

Piscataway, New Jersey
Unincorporated communities in Middlesex County, New Jersey
Unincorporated communities in New Jersey